The 1997 Brownlow Medal was the 70th year the award was presented to the player adjudged the fairest and best player during the Australian Football League (AFL) home-and-away season. Robert Harvey of the St Kilda Football Club won the medal by polling twenty-six votes during the 1997 AFL season. Despite polling more votes than Harvey, Chris Grant of the Western Bulldogs was ineligible due to suspension.

Leading vote-getters 

* The player was ineligible to win the medal due to suspension by the AFL Tribunal during the year.

References 

Brownlow Medal
1997
Brownlow Medal